Helaine Head (born January 17, 1947 in Los Angeles, California) is an American film, television, and theatre director.

Career
In television, some of her directing credits are St. Elsewhere, Cagney & Lacey, Frank's Place, L.A. Law, Wiseguy, Tour of Duty, Brewster Place, seaQuest 2032, Law & Order and Sliders. She has also directed a number of television films.
 
During the 1970s and early 1980s, Head worked as a theatre director and stage manager in a number of stage productions on Broadway.

In 1990, Head directed The Danger Team, a 24-minute claymation special intended to be the pilot episode of a potentially longer running TV show. The pilot aired on ABC on July 3, 1991, and featured claymation mixed with live actors. The pilot episode was poorly received and was not picked up for a full series.

In the 2000s, Head became an associate professor of directing at USC School of Cinematic Arts.

References

External links

1947 births
African-American film directors
African-American television directors
African-American theater directors
American television directors
American theatre directors
Women theatre directors
American women film directors
American women television directors
Living people
University of Southern California faculty
Directors Guild of America Award winners
Film directors from Los Angeles
American women academics
21st-century African-American people
21st-century African-American women
20th-century African-American people
20th-century African-American women